Umred Assembly constituency is one of twelve constituencies of Maharashtra Vidhan Sabha located in the Nagpur district.

It is a part of the Ramtek (Lok Sabha constituency) (SC) from Nagpur district.

Members of Legislative Assembly

See also 
Raju devnath parwe(MLA)2019.national congress party

Umred

References

Assembly constituencies of Nagpur district
Assembly constituencies of Maharashtra